A Whirlwind of Whiskers is a 1917 silent film short comedy directed by Alfred Santell and starring Lloyd Hamilton, Bud Duncan and Marin Sais. It was produced by the Kalem Company and released by the General Film Company.

Cast
Lloyd Hamilton - Ham
Bud Duncan - Bud
Marin Sais - Manicurist
Robert N. Bradbury - (*as R.E. Bradbury)
Edward Clisbee -
Jack Hoxie - (*as Hart Hoxie)

Preservation status
A copy is preserved in the Library of Congress collection.

References

External links
 A Whirlwind of Whiskers at IMDb.com

1917 films
Films directed by Alfred Santell
Kalem Company films
American silent short films
American black-and-white films
Silent American comedy films
1917 comedy films
1910s American films